Arabeh Galleh (also Romanized as Ārabeh Galleh) is a village in Chehel Shahid Rural District, in the Central District of Ramsar County, Mazandaran Province, Iran. At the 2006 census, its population was 243, in 67 families.

References 

Populated places in Ramsar County